Kenny Lewis (born 26 February  1974) is a retired Grenadian long jumper. He competed at the 1996 Olympic Games without reaching the final round.

References

External links

Profile, Sports-reference.com
 

1974 births
Living people
Grenadian long jumpers
Grenadian triple jumpers
Athletes (track and field) at the 1996 Summer Olympics
Olympic athletes of Grenada
Grenadian male athletes
People from St. George's, Grenada